I Killed Geronimo is a 1950 American Western film about the Chiricahua Apache leader Geronimo.

Directed by John Hoffman and starring James Ellison, Virginia Herrick, and Chief Thundercloud in the role of Geronimo, the film has been described as a "silly but likeable" B movie. It is based around the fictional murder of Geronimo - who in reality died of pneumonia at the age of 80 after a fall from his horse in February 1909, while still a prisoner of the United States at Fort Sill, Oklahoma.

Plot

Cast
James Ellison as Capt. Jeff Packard
Virginia Herrick as Julie Scott
Chief Thundercloud as Geronimo
Smith Ballew as Lt. Furness
Luther Crockett as Maj. Clem French
Jean Andren as Mrs. French
Ted Adams as Walt Anderson
Myron Healey as Frank Corcoran
Dennis Moore as Luke
Wes Hudman as Red (as Wesley Hudman)
Harte Wayne as Gen. Ives

References

It is a lesser known film but is an alternative to watch.

External links

1950 films
American black-and-white films
American historical films
1950s historical films
1950 Western (genre) films
Eagle-Lion Films films
Western (genre) cavalry films
American Western (genre) films
Films about Native Americans
1950s English-language films
Films directed by John Hoffman
1950s American films